The 1961 All-Ireland Intermediate Hurling Championship was the first staging of the All-Ireland hurling championship. The championship ended on 17 September 1961.

Wexford won the title after defeating London by 3–15 to 4–4 in the final.

Results

Leinster Intermediate Hurling Championship

Munster Intermediate Hurling Championship

All-Ireland Intermediate Hurling Championship

References

Intermediate
All-Ireland Intermediate Hurling Championship